Holly Trostle Brigham (born 1965) is an American figurative painter whose feminist self-portraiture focuses on female subjects drawn from mythology and history.  Brigham is a member of Corpus VI, a collective of figurative women artists.

Background and education 
Born and raised in Carlisle, Pennsylvania, Brigham studied art history and Italian at Smith College, and continued graduate work in art history at the University of Pittsburgh. Brigham then worked as an exhibition coordinator at the Philadelphia Museum of Art, and began studying painting at the Pennsylvania Academy of the Fine Arts in 1990. Enrolling in the Certificate program, she studied with artists Lou Sloan, Liz Osborne, and Dan Miller, and went on to earn her M.F.A. in painting from George Washington University. At GWU, she worked closely with the artists Arthur Hall Smith and Doug Teller, and with visiting artists such as Helen Frankenthaler, Larry Rivers, and Audrey Flack, who has said that “Holly Trostle Brigham is one of the most interesting young painters working today. She is pushing the depiction of the female figure into interesting new territory”.

Life and work 

Brigham began exploring the self-portrait intensively as an M.F.A. student, starting by reclaiming the female nude from centuries of passive poses dominated by the male gaze. She portrays the nude woman as strong, self-possessed, and even godly, as many of her subjects come from mythology: “Inspired by Flack’s use of mythology, her concept of reclaiming the matriarchy and the way in which Flack talked about how women artists could approach the female nude without objectifying it since subject and object were one and the same, Brigham began a series of watercolors for which she, herself, posed as the nude model.”

Going  “beyond the descriptive self-portrait”, Brigham then embarked on an ongoing series of paintings that merge her own history with art history, using self-portraiture to illuminate the lives of women artists and creators before her, such as in her Seven Sisters series.

The tremendous level of detail and iconography in her work invites the viewer to read her paintings as biography and autobiography intertwined: Brigham’s body performs the life of an historical figure while in turn, the choice and iconography of the figure reveal the events and concerns of Brigham’s own life, creating a “conflation of her self-image with their identities”. Brigham has stated that she often thinks of her work as “art history in reverse”: she began her education decoding the symbols and signifiers in the artwork of others, and now as an artist, she is encoding the emblems of her subjects.

Many of her paintings, such as Judith and Flora (2003) and Maria Sibylla Merian: Metamorphosis (2010), are intricate watercolors in “a muscular style with emphatic lights and darks reminiscent of the 1960s and 1970s work of Alfred Leslie”; but as in Zephyr, Angel, Wings and Me (2002), Brigham also uses oil paint. More recently, she has begun using found objects and sculpted relics to develop her themes in three dimensions, as in Hildegard’s Box (2013).

Brigham is currently collaborating with the renowned poet Marilyn Nelson on a project called Sacred Sisters that will result in an exhibition at the William Benton Museum of Art at the University of Connecticut, Storrs, and Penn State Lehigh Valley, as well as in an artist book.

Brigham has been artist in resident at the Experimental Printmaking Institute (EPI) at Lafayette College and has held many teaching positions, including posts at Pasadena City College, Worcester State College, Worcester Art Museum, and the Baum School of Art in Allentown, Pennsylvania. Featured at Art W Salon in New York and Evolve the Conversation in Philadelphia, she has also lectured at colleges, museums, and at the national meeting of the College Art Association in a panel on contemporary portraiture organized by Brandon Fortune, Senior Curator at the National Portrait Gallery.

She is represented by ACA Galleries in New York.

Selected exhibitions 
 Holly Trostle Brigham: Dis/Guise, Luther W. Brady Art Gallery at George Washington University, 2014
 Holly Trostle Brigham: Painted Dichotomies, Berman Museum of Art at Ursinus College, 2013
 Home Front Heroes: Women of World War II, The Gallery at Penn State Lehigh Valley, 2012
 Cradle and Crucible: The Enduring Legacy of the Pennsylvania Academy of the Fine Arts, Avery Galleries, 2011
 Holly Trostle Brigham: Three Stages, Raven Gallery, 2009
 Reflected Personae, Ahlum Gallery, 2005
 Undressed in Her Rightful Mind: Paintings by Holly Trostle Brigham, Clark University, 1998

Awards
 2004, Honorable Mention, Pennsylvania Academy of the Fine Arts
 2004, Best of Show, Lancaster County Art Association, Strasberg, Pennsylvania
 2004, First Prize for Watercolor, Harrisburg Art Association, Harrisburg, Pennsylvania
 2003, Award of Excellence, Artists Guild of Delaware Valley
 1992, David Lloyd Kreeger Prize in Painting, The George Washington University
 1992, Cecille R. Hunt Prize (for watercolor), The George Washington University

References

1965 births
Living people
20th-century American painters
Smith College alumni
University of Pittsburgh alumni
George Washington University alumni
21st-century American painters